David Lewis Dunlap (December 7, 1877 – July 9, 1954) was an American football player and coach of football, basketball, and baseball, college athletics administrator, and physician.  He played football for the University of Michigan's "Point-a-Minute" teams from 1901 to 1903 and 1905.  Dunlap was the head football coach and athletic director at Kenyon College in 1906, at the University of North Dakota from 1907 to 1911, and at Allegheny College in 1912.  He also coached basketball and baseball at North Dakota and basketball at Allegheny.

Early years
Dunlap was born in Iowa in 1877.  His father, James B. Dunlap, was a farmer who immigrated to the United States from Ireland as a boy in 1847.  Dunlap's mother, Clara M. Dunlap, was a New York native.  They settled in Hazel Green Township, Delaware County, Iowa, near Hopkinton, Iowa.  Dunlap had five older brothers and two older sisters.

Dunlap attended college at Lenox College in Hopkinton, Iowa.  He received a B.S. degree from Lenox in 1901.

University of Michigan
After graduating from Lenox, Dunlap enrolled in the Department of Medicine and Surgery at the University of Michigan.  He received his Doctor of Medicine degree in 1906.  While attending medical school, Dunlap played football for the Michigan Wolverines football team for four years from 1901 to 1903 and 1905.  He appeared in five games (Case, Albion, Beloit, Ohio Normal, Ferris) at right end (and was a starter in one game) for the 1903 team.<ref>The Michigan Alumnus, November 1903, pp. 83-86.</ref>  Two years later, he was a starter at halfback in four games (including the Kalamazoo and Case games) for the 1905 team.  During the 1905 season, a controversy developed as to Dunlap's eligibility.  He had participated in athletics at Lenox College, and some questioned whether he had a remaining fourth year of eligibility.  A letter was received from the person in charge of athletics at Iowa indicating that the Association of Colleges in Iowa did not consider Lenox to be a college.  The conference ruled that Dunlap remained eligible on the ground that Lenox was not a college.

Dunlap was also a member of Michigan's varsity track team for four years.  During the 1905–06 academic year, he also served as a student member of the Board of Control in charge of the general supervision of athletic sports at the University of Michigan.

Coaching
In the fall of 1906, Dunlap was hired as the football coach and athletic director at Kenyon College in Gambier, Ohio.  His 1906 football team tallied a record of 1–4–2. After one year at Kenyon, he accepted a similar position at the Orchard Military Academy.

From 1908 to 1911, Dunlap was the head football coach at the University of North Dakota.  In four years at North Dakota, he had a record of 14–7–2.  He also coached North Dakota's baseball team to a 3–6–1 record in 1910.

In August 1912, Dunlap was hired by Allegheny College as its physical and athletic director.It is likely that he also coached football at Allegheny.  However, the person who coached the Allegheny football team in 1911 and 1912 is identified as David S. Dunlap.  In addition to the different middle initial, there is a discrepancy as to how he could have coached football at both North Dakota and Allegheny in 1911. At the time of his hiring, the Boston Evening Transcript'' wrote:"Dr. Dunlap is thirty-four years of age and stands six feet.  He was under Yost for three years at Michigan in football, and has also acquired a good reputation as a coach.  He also has a record in track.  Apart from his all-around ability as physical director, Dr. Dunlap's greatest strength seems to be as coach in football and trainer in track."

He later returned to North Dakota as its athletic director.

Family and later years
In September 1913, Dunlap married Lulu Elta Loomis at Ypsilanti, Michigan.  In a draft registration card completed in September 1918, Dunlap indicated that he was living in Highland Park, Michigan with his.  He was a self-employed physician with an office in the Kresge Building in Detroit.  At the time of the 1920 United States Census, Dunlap was still in private practice as a physician and living with his wife in Highland Park.  By that time, they had two sons David (age 4) and Gregg (age 2).  Ten years later, Dunlap and his wife remained living in Highland Park, and Dunlap continued in private practice as a physician.  By that time, they had four children, Ward (age 15), David (14), Gregg (age 13) and Jean (age 6).

Head coaching record

Football

References

External links
 

1877 births
1954 deaths
American football ends
American football halfbacks
Basketball coaches from Iowa
Allegheny Gators football coaches
Allegheny Gators men's basketball coaches
Michigan Wolverines football players
Kenyon Lords football coaches
North Dakota Fighting Hawks athletic directors
North Dakota Fighting Hawks baseball coaches
North Dakota Fighting Hawks football coaches
North Dakota Fighting Hawks men's basketball coaches
Players of American football from Iowa
Physicians from Michigan
University of Michigan Medical School alumni